The Alberg 35 is a fiberglass sailboat designed by Carl Alberg. It is also known as the Pearson Alberg 35. The design was produced not only by Pearson Yachts in Rhode Island, but also by AeroMarine Composites and Ericson Yachts. It is the larger cousin of the Alberg 30 and the Pearson Triton. The Alberg 35 was the second yacht put into production by Pearson after the hugely successful Triton. In the case of Ericson, boats were produced from Pearson molds that had been salvaged by Ericson employees from a California landfill; the Alberg 35 became one of Ericson's early successes.

Specifications 

LOA:  34'-9"

LWL:  24'-0"	

Beam:  9'-8"

Draft:  5'-2"
	
Ballast:  5300 lb (Lead)	

Sail Area (100%):  

Displacement:  

PHRF Race Rating: 198

References

External links
 http://www.alberg35.org/
 https://sailboat.guide/pearson/alberg-35
 http://www.alberg35.com/ (restoration blog)

Sailing yachts
1960s sailboat type designs
Sailboat types built by Ericson Yachts
Sailboat type designs by Carl Alberg